Countess Marie Louise Larisch von Moennich (also known as Countess Marie Louise Larisch-Wallersee and Countess Marie Larisch) (24 February 1858 – 4 July 1940) was
the niece and confidante of Empress Elisabeth of Austria.  She was implicated in the Mayerling Incident which resulted in the death of her married cousin Crown Prince Rudolf and his mistress Baroness Mary Vetsera, who was also her friend. She published several books with a ghostwriter about the Imperial household.

Early life
The Countess was born Marie Louise Elizabeth Mendel on 24 February 1858 in Augsburg, Bavaria, the illegitimate daughter of actress Henriette Mendel, Baroness von Wallersee (1833–1891). Her father, Ludwig Wilhelm, Duke in Bavaria (1831–1920) was the eldest son of Duke Maximilian Joseph in Bavaria and Princess Ludovika of Bavaria and had the title of Duke in Bavaria (German: Herzog in Bayern).  He was properly addressed as "His Royal Highness," as a member of the cadet branch of the House of Wittelsbach in Bavaria.  Ludwig Wilhelm was the first cousin of King Maximilian II of Bavaria and also of Emperor Franz Joseph I of Austria whose mother, Princess Sophie of Bavaria, was a daughter of Maximilian I.  One of Ludwig Wilhelm's younger sisters, Elisabeth, married Emperor Franz Joseph and another, Maria Sophie, married Francis II of the Two Sicilies just before he became king.  Yet her father renounced, on 9 March 1859, his rights as firstborn son, and Henriette (or Henrietta) Mendel was created Baroness of Wallersee (Freifrau von Wallersee) on 19 May 1859 in preparation for their morganatic marriage on 28 May 1859 in Augsburg. From 28 May 1859, Marie was thus a Baroness of Wallersee (Freiin von Wallersee). Marie became a confidante of her aunt, the Empress Elisabeth of Austria.

Early adulthood
Marie had five children during this marriage. The first two were fathered by her husband: their first-born oceanographer Franz-Joseph Ludwig Georg Maria, Count Larisch of Moennich, Baron of Ellgoth and Karwin (1878–1937), followed by Marie Valerie (1879–1915). The two younger children, Marie Henriette (1884–1907) and  Georg (1886–1909) were fathered by Heinrich Baltazzi (1858-1929), uncle of her cousin Crown Prince Rudolf's mistress Baroness Mary Vetsera, while Friedrich Karl (1894–1929) was fathered by publisher Karl Ernst von Otto-Kreckwitz (1861-1938).  She received financial support from her cousin Crown Prince Rudolf. 

Rudolf shot his 17-year-old mistress Baronness Mary Vetsera and committed suicide on 30 January 1889 - a scandal known as the Mayerling Incident. It was subsequently revealed that Marie Larisch had acted as go-between for Rudolph and Mary Vetsera. Distanced from Empress Elisabeth and the nobility, she moved to Bavaria.

After divorcing Count Larisch on 3 December 1896, she married the musician Otto Brucks (1854–1914) in Munich on 15 May 1897. They had one child, Otto (1899–1977). Her husband's career foundered due to his association with "that Countess Larisch" and his dependency on alcohol. In 1906, her husband became director of the theatre of Metz.

Writer
From 1898, Marie began to write about her experiences with the Empress and other Imperial and Royal relatives. The Imperial house paid her "hush money" not to publish her memoirs. In 1913, she published her memoirs, My Past, despite her contract with the Imperial house. She later published a series of other ghost-written works.

World War I and its aftermath
During World War I she worked at the front as a nurse. In 1921, she portrayed herself in a silent film, Kaiserin Elisabeth von Österreich, about Empress Elisabeth that she co-authored.

Death
Marie died in 1940 in a nursing home at Augsburg and was buried in the Ostfriedhof in Munich.

Personal life 
On 20 October 1877, at Jagdschloß Gödöllő in Hungary, she married Count Georg Larisch von Moennich, Baron of Ellgoth and Karwin (1855–1928), second child and the only son Count Leo Larisch von Mönnich (1824-1872) and his Romanian wife, Princess Irina Stirbey (1831-1864).  The marriage had been arranged by the Empress. They had:
 Count Franz Joseph Larisch von Mönnich (1878-1937); married to Maria Satterfield (1879-1947) and had issue
 Countess Marie Valerie Larisch von Mönnich (1879-1907)
 Countess Marie Henriette Larisch von Mönnich (1884-1907); her biological father was Heinrich Baltazzi (1858-1929)
 Count Heinrich Georg Larisch von Mönnich (1886-1909); his biological father was also Heinrich Baltazzi (1858-1929)
 Count Friedrich Karl Larisch von Mönnich (1894-1929); his biological father was Karl Ernst von Otto-Kreckwitz (1861-1938)

On 15 May 1897 in Munich, she married for the second time. This time to Otto Brucks (1854-1914).

In 1924, an article was published in New York claiming that she would marry anybody who would pay her and her son the fare to America. On 2 September 1924, she married naturopath William H. Meyers (1859-1930) in Elizabeth, New Jersey and they lived in Florida. In 1926, she fled to New Jersey, to work as a housemaid. She returned to Germany in 1929.

Works
1913: My Past 
1934: Secrets of a Royal House 
1936: My Royal Relatives. In this work she claims to have been the daughter of Marie, Queen of the Two Sicilies by "Count Armand de Lavaÿss"

Legacy
Marie met and conversed with the poet T. S. Eliot, and part of their conversation found its way into his epochal poem The Waste Land.
And when we were children, staying at the archduke's,
My cousin's, he took me out on a sled,
And I was frightened. He said, Marie,
Marie, hold on tight.  And down we went.
In the mountains, there you feel free.
I read, much of the night, and go south in the winter.

Notes

References

External links
Online version of My Past

1858 births
1940 deaths
Austrian countesses
Burials at the Ostfriedhof (Munich)
Austrian memoirists